Brasileirinho (Little Brazilian) is a 1947 choro composed by Waldir Azevedo. It is considered a one of the most successful and influential choros of all time; this standard has been covered by many artists, like singer Carmen Miranda, acoustic guitarist , guitarist Pepeu Gomes, and cellist Yo-Yo Ma (Obrigado Brazil). It was voted by the Brazilian edition of Rolling Stone as the 53rd greatest Brazilian song. The 2005 documentary Brasileirinho, about the choro genre, is named after the 1947 song.

References 

1947 songs
Songs with music by Valdir Azevedo
Choro songs
Brazilian patriotic songs